Angelica Zawadzki (born June 15, 1952) is a Mexican sprint canoer who competed in the late 1960s. She was eliminated in the semifinals of the K-2 500 m event at the 1968 Summer Olympics in Mexico City.

References
Sports-reference.com profile

1952 births
Canoeists at the 1968 Summer Olympics
Living people
Mexican female canoeists
Olympic canoeists of Mexico
Mexican people of Polish descent
Place of birth missing (living people)